Sweet Talk may refer to:

Books
Sweet Talk, novel by Julie Garwood
Sweet Talk, novel by Susan Mallery 2008
Sweet Talk, novel by Hank Janson 1965
Sweet Talk, 1973 play by Michael Abbensetts 
Sweet Talk, 1995 play by Peter Lefcourt, adapted for 2013 film

Film and TV 
Sweet Talk, 2013 film directed by Terri Hanauer with Karen Austin, John Glover

Music

Albums
Sweet Talk, album by Robin Beck 1979  
Sweet Talk, album by The Manhattans 1989
Sweet Talk, album by Reneé Austin 2003
Sweet Talk, album by Eric Marienthal 2005
Sweet Talk and Good Lies album by Heather Myles  2002

Songs 
"Sweet Talk", single by Bobby Comstock, written Doc Pomus and Mort Shuman 1959
"Sweet Talk", single by Boots Randolph, also by The Play Boys, written by Dick Reynolds (musician) 
"Sweet Talk", single by Lainie Kazan written Cy Coleman, Floyd Huddleston 1966
"Sweet Talk", single by Girl Skwadd 1979, Steve O'Donnell (musician)
"Sweet Talk", single by D'Atra Hicks 1989, No.8 US R&B 
"Sweet Talk", single by Hipsway 1989 
"Sweet Talk", single by Faye Adams  1953 
"Sweet Talk", single by Priscilla Mitchell 1966
"Sweet Talk", song from The Victors (film) 1963
"Sweet Talk", debut single by Robin Beck 1979 
"Sweet Talk", song by The Killers from Sawdust 2007
"Sweet Talk" (Samantha Jade song) 2014, No.38 in Australia 
"Sweet Talk", song by Peggy Lee Let's Love (album) 1974 
"Sweet Talk", song by Sheena Easton	from album Best Kept Secret   1983	
"Sweet Talk", song by Uriah Heep Head First
"Sweet Talk", song by Amii Stewart from Love Affair (album) 1996
"Sweet Talk", song by Jessie Ware Devotion
"Sweet Talk", song by Spank Rock from YoYoYoYoYo 2006 
"Sweet Talk", song by English rock band Spiritualized from Songs in A&E 2008
"Sweet Talk", single by Lee Aaron  1990
"Sweet Talk", remix of "Mr. Brightside" by Stuart Price
"Sweet Talk", song by Dear and the Headlights from Small Steps, Heavy Hooves  
"Sweet Talk", song by Cymande  Arrival (Cymande album)
"Sweet Talk", song by Isac Elliot from Wake Up World (album) 2013
"Sweet Talk", song by Saint Motel from Sainmotelevision
"Sweet Talk", instrumental by Paul Bley from Modern Chant 
"Sweet Talk", Korean-language song by Girls' Generation from Holiday Night

See also
 Sweet Talker (disambiguation)